Mike B. James (born 21 July 1973 in Vancouver, British Columbia, Canada) is a former professional Canadian rugby union player. Standing at 196 cm tall and weighing in at 110 kg, James is an imposing figure and is well known for his expertise in the set pieces. He has played for the prestigious French Barbarians, and was featured in the 2005 team that included New Zealand greats Justin Marshall and Kees Meeuws. He last played in France for Stade Français, having started his career with 4 years in Perpignan USAP and was part of the great Stade teams that won the French Premiership titles in 2003, 2004 and 2007. James also played in 2 Heineken Cup Finals in 2001 and 2005.

He earned 57 caps for Canada, 9 of which have come from World Cup matches. He captained Canada on several occasions, and most recently in the match against France at Nantes. James appeared in 4 World Cups – in 1995, 1999, 2003 and 2007

James retired from playing in 2008 and returned to Vancouver, where he was appointed as head coach of Burnaby Lake Rugby Club. He coached his old club for just over two seasons.

He has since served as coach of the BC Bears and served 6 years on the BC Rugby Board of Directors.

He is now a successful Mortgage Broker based in North Vancouver, BC.

Honours
 Stade Français
Top 14: 2002–03, 2003–04, 2006–07

References

External links 
Mike James statistics at Scrum.Com

1973 births
Living people
Canadian rugby union coaches
Canadian rugby union players
Rugby union locks
Sportspeople from Vancouver
Stade Français players
Canada international rugby union players